Friendly Persuasion is a made-for-TV movie. The film is based on the novels The Friendly Persuasion and Except for Me and Thee by Jessamyn West; the former novel was previously adapted in 1956. It originally aired on ABC on May 18, 1975.

This version is different from the 1956 version because it focuses mainly on West's sequel novel, Except for Me and Thee. It was going to be a TV series with this being the pilot. Friendly Persuasion did not gain as big of an audience as ABC had hoped. This film is not available on VHS or LaserDisc, and there are no plans of a DVD release.

Plot summary 
In Civil War era America, a Quaker family, Jess and Eliza Birdwell, helps slaves who have run away, knowing that they could die.

Cast
Source:Hollywood.com; BFI

Richard Kiley as Jess Birdwell
Shirley Knight as Eliza Birdwell
Clifton James as Sam Jordan
Michael O'Keefe as Josh Birdwell
Kevin O'Keefe as Labe
Tracie Savage as Mattie
Sparky Marcus as Little Jess
Paul Benjamin as Swan Stebeney
Erik Holland as Enoch
Maria Grimm as Lily Truscott
Bob Minor as Burk
Gus Peters
Twila Pollard as Farmer's Wife
Walter Scott

References

External links 
 

American television films
Films about religion
1975 television films
1975 films
Films directed by Joseph Sargent
Films based on multiple works